Octavian Dincuță (28 June 1947 – 28 March 2018) was a Romanian football forward and a manager.

International career
Octavian Dincuță played one friendly game at international level for Romania, appearing on 24 December 1967 when coach Angelo Niculescu used him in order to replace Vasile Gergely at the halftime of a 1–1 against Congo.

Honours
Petrolul Ploiești
Divizia A: 1965–66

Notes

References

External links

Octavian Dincuță at Labtof.ro

1947 births
2018 deaths
Romanian footballers
Romania international footballers
Association football forwards
Liga I players
Liga II players
FC Petrolul Ploiești players
CSO Plopeni players
FC Gloria Buzău players
Romanian football managers
Footballers from Bucharest